In Pleistocene palaeontology, a mammalian assemblage zone (MAZ) is a collection of fossil bones of mammals.

References

Paleontology